El gran almuerzo de José Campo (U.S. title: "José's Big Lunch") is a 1928 Mexican film. It was directed by Chano Urueta as his second feature. It is a social satire about a rich man who holds a banquet in Guadalajara only to have it end in catastrophe. It is thought to be a lost film.

References

1928 films
Mexican silent films
Films directed by Chano Urueta
Mexican black-and-white films